Allium bungei is a species of flowering plant belonging to the family Amaryllidaceae.

It is native to Iran.

The species is named after Russian botanist Alexander von Bunge.

References

bungei
Endemic flora of Iran